María Elena González (born 1957 in Havana, Cuba) is a Cuban-American artist best known for her sculptural installations. Gonzalez was raised as Roman Catholic, but once she moved to the United States at age 11 she stopped following that religion. She immigrated to the United States in 1968. In 1999, González received widespread acclaim for her site-specific outdoor sculpture, Magic Carpet/Home. Commissioned by the Public Art Fund, it was originally installed in Brooklyn, New York, and subsequently in Pittsburgh, Pennsylvania and Los Angeles, California. In the summer of 2005, González was a resident faculty member at the Skowhegan School of Painting and Sculpture. In 2005 and 2008, she was also a Visiting Artist faculty member at the Cooper Union School of Art. She currently teaches at the San Francisco Art Institute.

Education and awards
González received a BFA in 1979 from Florida International University, and an MA in sculpture in 1983 from San Francisco State University. She had her first solo exhibition in New York in 1991 at the Nuyorican Poets Café. González has been awarded grants from organizations that include the Cintas Foundation (1989, 1994); the Pollock-Krasner Foundation (1991, 1998); Anonymous Was a Woman (1997); the Louis Comfort Tiffany Foundation (1997); the Joan Mitchell Foundation (1998); the Creative Capital Foundation (1999, 2001); The Cuban Artists Fund (2000); the Penny McCall Foundation (2001); and the New York State Council on the Arts (2003). She was recipient of the Rome Prize from the American Academy in Rome for 2003–04, and was a 2006 Guggenheim Fellow. In 2013 she won the Grand Prize at the  30th Biennial of Graphic Arts in Ljubljana, Slovenia.

Selected public exhibitions

Selected solo exhibitions
Galerie Gisèle Linder, Basel, Switzerland (2005, 2009)
Knoedler & Company, New York (2006, 2008)
The Project, New York (1999–2006)
The Contemporary Museum, Honolulu (now the Honolulu Museum of Art Spalding House) (2006)
DiverseWorks, Houston, Art Museum of the University of Memphis, Tennessee, and Art in General, New York (2002–03)
Center for Art and Visual Culture, University of Maryland, Baltimore (2002)
The Bronx Museum of Art (2002)
Los Angeles Contemporary Exhibitions (LACE), a Creative Capital Foundation Project, Los Angeles (2002)
Ludwig Foundation, Havana, Cuba (2000)
Public Art Fund, Public Art Project, Brooklyn (1999)
El Museo del Barrio, New York (1996–97).

Selected group exhibitions
Museum of Latin American Art (2017)
Los Angeles County Museum of Art (2017)
the Kunstmuseum Solothurn, Switzerland (2008)
the National Academy Museum & School of Fine Arts, New York (2008)
the Solomon R. Guggenheim Museum, New York (2007)
Miami Art Museum (2005–06)
P.S. 1 / MoMA Contemporary Art Center, New York (2000, 2003)

Public collections

Kunstmuseum Basel, Switzerland
The Contemporary Museum, Honolulu, Hawaii
Maxine & Stuart Frankel Foundation for Art, Bloomfield Hills, Michigan
the Solomon R. Guggenheim Museum, New York
Museum of Art, Rhode Island School of Design, Providence
North Carolina Museum of Art, Raleigh
Museum Biedermann, Donaueschingen, Germany
Museum voor Moderne Kunst, Arnhem, Netherlands
The New School for Social Research, New York
Stedelijk Museum voor Actuele Kunst, Ghent, Belgium.

References

Selected bibliography
 Brillembourg, Carlos "Maria Elena González," Bomb (Winter 2002-03)
Chadwick, Whitney Maria Elena González: Suspension. New York: Knoedler & Company, 2008
Cotter, Holland "Maria Elena González," The New York Times (January 20, 2006)
Durant, Mary Alice Maria Elena González: Selected Works, 1996–2002. Baltimore: Center for Art, Design and Visual Culture, University of Maryland, 2002
Heartney, Eleanor Maria Elena González: Internal DupliCity. New York: Knoedler & Company, 2006
Princenthal, Nancy, et al. UnReal Estates: Maria Elena González. Houston: DiverseWorks, 2002
Schwendener, Martha "Maria Elena González: Art in General," Artforum (January 2004)

External links
BOMB magazine interview by Carlos Brillembourg
Kunstbulletin
The Brooklyn Rail review of Internal DupliCity at Knoedler & Co. gallery 2006

1957 births
Living people
20th-century Cuban women artists
21st-century Cuban women artists
People from Havana
Florida International University alumni
San Francisco State University alumni